Charles Richard Soleau (October 24, 1909 – April 18 1963) was an American college football player and coach. He was also the father of National Football League (NFL) player Bob Soleau.

Playing career
Soleau was an All-American quarterback for the Colgate Red Raiders (now called simply the "Colgate Raiders") from 1929 until 1932, where he played under Hall of Fame coach Andrew Kerr.  

He was also named to the 1932 "All-Scout" team by Boys' Life magazine. Parke H. Davis recognized the 1932 team as national champion.

Coaching career
In 1942, Soleau served as an assistant coach for the North Carolina Pre-Flight Cloudbusters. 

He was later named the head college football coach for the Franklin & Marshall Diplomats located in Lancaster, Pennsylvania. He held that position for the 1946 and 1947 seasons. His coaching record at Franklin & Marshall was 7–7–1.

References

1909 births
1963 deaths
American football quarterbacks
Colgate Raiders football players
Franklin & Marshall Diplomats football coaches
North Carolina Pre-Flight Cloudbusters football coaches
Coaches of American football from New Jersey
Players of American football from Newark, New Jersey